Kleitman is a surname. Notable people with the surname include:

Daniel Kleitman (born 1934), American mathematician and professor
Nathaniel Kleitman (1895–1999), American physiologist and sleep researcher 
Zina Kleitman, Israeli diplomat

See also
Kleiman